IARU may refer to:
 International Amateur Radio Union
 International Alliance of Research Universities
 Irish Amateur Rowing Union - former title of Rowing Ireland
 An alternative spelling for Aaru in ancient Egyptian mythology